John Madison Younginer IV (born November 3, 1990) is an American former professional baseball pitcher.  He played in Major League Baseball (MLB) for the Atlanta Braves in 2016.

Career
Younginer attended Mauldin High School in Mauldin, South Carolina. The Boston Red Sox selected Younginer in the seventh round of the 2009 MLB draft. Younginer signed with the Red Sox, receiving a $1 million signing bonus, rather than attend Clemson University. He pitched in the Red Sox farm system from 2010 through 2015, reaching as high as Triple-A with the Pawtucket Red Sox.

Younginer signed a minor league contract with the Atlanta Braves prior to the 2016 season, and they promoted him to the major leagues on August 7, 2016. He became a free agent. On November 17, 2016, Younginer signed a minor league contract with the Los Angeles Dodgers and he was assigned to the Triple-A Oklahoma City Dodgers to begin the season, where he was selected to the mid-season Pacific Coast League all-star team. In 40 games (3 starts) for Oklahoma City, he was 4–5 with a 4.76 ERA.

On January 25, 2018, Younginer signed a minor league deal with the San Francisco Giants. He was released on June 5, 2018. On June 16, 2018, Younginer signed a minor league deal with the Los Angeles Dodgers. He appeared in seven games in the Dodgers farm system, across three levels, before he was released on July 26.

Younginer completed a month-long assignment with the Canberra Cavalry of the Australian Baseball League in January 2019, and retired from professional baseball after that.

On July 28, 2020, Younginer came out of retirement to sign with the Sioux Falls Canaries of the American Association of Independent Professional Baseball. He was released on September 9, 2020.

Personal life
Younginer's cousin is Brandon Snyder.

References

External links

1990 births
Living people
People from Simpsonville, South Carolina
Baseball players from South Carolina
Major League Baseball pitchers
Atlanta Braves players
Lowell Spinners players
Greenville Drive players
Gulf Coast Red Sox players
Salem Red Sox players
Surprise Saguaros players
Portland Sea Dogs players
Pawtucket Red Sox players
Gwinnett Braves players
Mississippi Braves players
Oklahoma City Dodgers players
Sacramento River Cats players
Arizona League Dodgers players
Tulsa Drillers players
Sioux Falls Canaries players
American expatriate baseball players in Australia